Les Acteurs de bonne foi is a comedy in one act and in prose written by French playwright Pierre de Marivaux and performed for the first time on October 30, 1749. 
Les Acteurs de bonne foi was produced by the Comédie-Française but was not a success. Marivaux published it in the Conservateur journal in November 1757.
The play is built on the dialogue the author established with the reader through the mise en abyme device. In effect, the text features interviews with the actors, discussion about the possibilities of staging, and lines from a play that is to be performed. Les Acteurs de bonne foi is the last play Marivaux had performed in a large theatre; it is a hybrid text where comedy quickly leads to confusion between reality and the play, with the mise en abyme highlighting the importance of dramatic illusion.

Characters 
 Madam Argante, Angélique's mother.
 Madam Amelin, Éraste's aunt.
 Araminte, a friend of theirs.
 Éraste, Madam Amelin's nephew and Angélique's lover.
 Angélique, Madam Argante's daughter.
 Merlin, Éraste's servant and Lisette's lover.
 Lisette, Angélique's servant.
 Blaise, Madam Argante's farmer's son and Colette's lover.
 Colette, gardener's daughter.
 A Solicitor

Plot 
On the day of Angélique and Éraste's wedding, Merlin improvises a comedy with other actors

Bibliography 
  Eric Eigenmann, « Monnaie de la pièce : Les Acteurs de bonne foi de Marivaux », Être riche au siècle de Voltaire, pp. 349–361. Geneva: Droz, 1996.
  Brigitte Girard, « La Logique marivaudienne dans Les Acteurs de bonne foi », Travaux sur le XVIIIe, pp. 75–86.Angers: Université d’Angers, U. E. R. des Lettres et Sciences Humaines, 1978.

References

Plays by Pierre de Marivaux
Comedy plays